Mack Hollins (born September 16, 1993) is an American football wide receiver for the Atlanta Falcons of the National Football League (NFL). He played college football at North Carolina, and was drafted by the Philadelphia Eagles in the fourth round of the 2017 NFL Draft.

High school career
Hollins attended Robert Frost Middle School in Rockville, Maryland and later Thomas S. Wootton High School. After not receiving any scholarship offers out of high school, Hollins attended Fork Union Military Academy in Fork Union, Virginia, where he played with Cardale Jones who led the Ohio State Buckeyes to the College Football Playoff National Championship. Hollins received several offers to join teams, including a walk-on opportunity on the University of North Carolina football team if he could get accepted to the university on his own. In 2012, he was accepted into the school, and joined the team as a walk-on.

College career
As a freshman in 2013, Hollins was named special teams captain after appearing in all 13 games. He played on most special teams and as a reserve wide receiver. He finished the regular season with nine tackles and recovered a fumble against Duke.

As a sophomore in 2014 Hollins earned honorable mention All-ACC accolades after finishing with 35 catches for a team-high 613 yards. He also had a team-best eight receiving touchdowns. One of Carolina's best special teams players, he also had seven tackles and recovered an onside kick. He earned ACC Receiver of the Week honors after catching two passes for 120 yards and two touchdowns against Virginia. Both touchdowns were over 50 yards (57 and 63), making Hollins the first Tar Heel to have two touchdown receptions of 50+ yards since Hakeem Nicks in 2008. Reeled in a 91-yard touchdown pass in the win over San Diego State University. The 91-yard scoring play with QB Marquise Williams was the longest play by UNC in Kenan Stadium history and third-longest play in school history.

As a junior in 2015, Hollins led all NCAA major college players with an average of 24.8 yards per reception. He caught at least one pass in all 13 games and found the end zone in seven different contests, including five of UNC's six wins  He picked up his second ACC Receiver of the Week honor after catching five balls for 165 yards and a 74-yard touchdown in the win over Duke. Hollins became the first Tar Heel to catch three touchdown passes since 2011 when he tallied three scores against Wake Forest. His first ACC Receiver of the Week honors of the year came after catching three passes for 100 yards and two touchdowns in the win over Delaware.

College statistics

Professional career

Philadelphia Eagles
Hollins was drafted by the Philadelphia Eagles in the fourth round, 118th overall, in the 2017 NFL Draft. In Week 2, against the Kansas City Chiefs, he had his first three career receptions, which went for 32 total yards in the 27–20 loss. In Week 7, against the Washington Redskins, he recorded a 64-yard touchdown reception from quarterback Carson Wentz. His 64-yard reception was the first touchdown of his career.  Hollins also played heavily on special teams.

In 2018, Hollins and the Eagles beat the New England Patriots in Super Bowl LII, with Hollins primarily playing on special teams.

On September 6, 2018, Hollins was placed on injured reserve with a groin injury.

During the 2019 offseason, Hollins gave his jersey number, No. 10, to veteran DeSean Jackson, who had worn the number during his time playing in Philadelphia from 2008 to 2013. Hollins changed to No. 16.

On December 3, 2019, Hollins was waived by the Eagles.

Miami Dolphins
On December 4, 2019, Hollins was claimed off waivers by the Miami Dolphins.

In Week 9 of the 2020 season against the Arizona Cardinals, Hollins hauled in an 11-yard fourth quarter touchdown pass over the head of his defender, helping the Dolphins to their fourth straight win. In Week 13 against the Cincinnati Bengals, Hollins was ejected from the game after fighting Bengals players. In Week 16 against the Las Vegas Raiders, Hollins caught a 34-yard pass from Ryan Fitzpatrick to set up the game winning field goal in the final seconds of the game.

Hollins re-signed with the Dolphins on March 23, 2021. On September 8, he was named one of five team captains for the 2021 season, as voted by his teammates.

Las Vegas Raiders
On March 17, 2022, Hollins signed with the Las Vegas Raiders. On September 25, Hollins caught eight receptions for a career-high 158 yards and a touchdown, during a 24–22 loss to the Tennessee Titans.

Atlanta Falcons
On March 19, 2023, Hollis signed a one-year contract with the Atlanta Falcons.

See also
 List of NCAA major college football yearly receiving leaders

References

External links
Miami Dolphins bio
North Carolina Tar Heels bio

1993 births
Living people
American football wide receivers
Las Vegas Raiders players
Miami Dolphins players
North Carolina Tar Heels football players
Philadelphia Eagles players
Players of American football from Maryland
Sportspeople from Rockville, Maryland